Gondwana was a supercontinent also known as Gondwanaland.

Gondwana or Gondwanaland may also refer to:

 Gondwana Game Reserve, a game reserve in the Western Cape of South Africa
 Gondwana Rainforests, subtropical rainforest in Australia
 Gondwana (India), region also known as Gondaranya
 Gondwana (band), Chilean reggae group
 Gondwanaland (Australian band), Australian world music band
 Gondwanaland (Gondwanaland album)
 Gondwanaland (Steroid Maximus album)
 Gondwana (Murail), musical composition by Tristan Murail
 "Gondwana", the title of one half of a 1975 live concert recording by Miles Davis from the album Pangaea
 Polygondwanaland, the twelfth studio album by King Gizzard & the Lizard Wizard
 Gondwana-1, a submarine communications cable between Australia and New Caledonia
 Gondwana Choirs, an Australian National Children's Choir 
 MV Gondwana, a 1975 ship that belonged to Greenpeace